The 2015 TCR International Series Monza round was the fifth round of the 2015 TCR International Series season. It took place on 24 May at the Autodromo Nazionale di Monza.

Gianni Morbidelli won both races, driving a Honda Civic Type R TCR (FK2).

Success Ballast
Due to the results obtained in the previous round, Jordi Gené received +30 kg, Nicki Thiim +20 kg and Michel Nykjær +10 kg. Nevertheless, Thiim didn't take part at this event, so he would have taken the ballast at the first round he would have participated.

Classification

Qualifying

Race 1

Race 2

Notes:
 — Stefano Comini, Michel Nykjær, Mikhail Grachev and Sergey Afanasyev were moved to the back of the grid because of a parc fermé infringement.

Standings after the event

Drivers' Championship standings

Teams' Championship standings

 Note: Only the top five positions are included for both sets of drivers' standings.

References

External links
TCR International Series official website

Monza
TCR International Series